Chlorosterrha semialba is a moth in the family Geometridae first described by Charles Swinhoe in 1906. This species is known from Angola.

References

Endemic fauna of Angola
Geometrinae
Insects of Angola
Moths of Africa